Vladimir Tuganov (born 17 July 1961) is a Russian equestrian. He competed in two events at the 2004 Summer Olympics.

References

1961 births
Living people
Russian male equestrians
Olympic equestrians of Russia
Equestrians at the 2004 Summer Olympics
Equestrians at the 2012 Summer Olympics
Sportspeople from Vladikavkaz